Medea is a 1988 Danish tragedy television film directed by Lars von Trier. It is based on Carl Theodor Dreyer's adaptation of Euripides' play Medea.

Plot
King Creon of Corinth wants to secure his throne. In order to do this, he wants to marry the successful warrior Jason to his daughter Glauce. Jason accepts, but he is already married to Medea. Since Medea is known as a wise woman, Creon feels need to banish Medea and her two boys from the city. She begs him to let him stay, but he gives her only one day in order to secure the needs of the two boys.

Medea makes an agreement with the king of Athens, Aegeus, that she and the two boys can come live in Athens with his protection. She then plans to murder both Glauce and Creon and eventually her own children.

Cast
Udo Kier as Jason
Kirsten Olesen as Medea
Henning Jensen as Creon
Solbjørg Højfeldt as Nurse
Preben Lerdorff Rye as Pedagog
Baard Owe as Aegeus
Ludmilla Glinska as Glauce
Vera Gebuhr as Old chaperone
Jonny Kilde as Old boy
Richard Kilde as Young boy
Dick Kaysø as Voice of Jaeson
Mette Munk Plum as Voice of Glauce

Critical reception 
The film was received with critical acclaim. Rotten Tomatoes gives a score of 86% based on 14 reviews.

References

External links 
 

1988 films
Carl Theodor Dreyer
Danish drama films
1980s Danish-language films
Films based on Medea (Euripides play)
Films directed by Lars von Trier